Armando Franco (born October 30, 1964) is a Puerto Rican politician affiliated with the Popular Democratic Party (PPD). He was elected to the Puerto Rico House of Representatives in 2012 to represent District 17.

References

Living people
People from Aguadilla, Puerto Rico
Popular Democratic Party members of the House of Representatives of Puerto Rico
1964 births